The Glow Stakes is a race for Thoroughbred horses held as an undercard to the Grade I Darley Test Stakes at Saratoga Race Course in the USA in August. The Glow Stakes is restricted to non-winners of a turf race for 3-year-olds during the course of the preceding year, and is set at one mile on the inner track.

An ungraded stakes event, it offers a purse of $80,000.

This race was not listed as running in 2009 on the official Saratoga site.

Past winners

 2008 - Canceled?
 2007 - Pays to Dream (Teuflesberg placed, Biggerbadderbetter came in third.)

Ungraded stakes races in the United States
Horse races in New York (state)
Turf races in the United States